Douis or Doui may refer to:

People 
 Gerard Douis, French archer
Jean-François Douis, French former footballer
Tahar Douis, Moroccan wrestler of alligators
Yvon Douis, French former footballer

Places 

 Bordj Douis, town and commune in the Djelfa Province of Algeria
 Doui Thabet, town and commune in the Saïda Province of Algeria

Other uses 

 Doui-Menia, Arab tribe of the Moroccan-Algerian border